"911 / Mr. Lonely" is a song by American rapper Tyler, the Creator. It was released on June 30, 2017 alongside, "Who Dat Boy" through Columbia Records, as the lead singles from his fourth studio album Flower Boy. The song was produced by Tyler and features guest vocals from Frank Ocean, Steve Lacy, and Anna of the North.

Background
Tyler, the Creator released a preview of the song at the end of his music video for "Who Dat Boy". Tyler then released the song along with "Who Dat Boy" as double singles on June 30, 2017. The song is an interpolation of "Outstanding" by The Gap Band.

Track listing

Charts

Certifications

Release history

References

2017 singles
2017 songs
Columbia Records singles
Frank Ocean songs
Music medleys
Neo soul songs
Songs about loneliness
Songs written by Frank Ocean
Songs written by Steve Lacy (guitarist)
Songs written by Tyler, the Creator
Tyler, the Creator songs